Norman Andrew Davison (December 13, 1907 – June 28, 1990) was a politician in Ontario, Canada. He was a CCF and New Democrat member of the Legislative Assembly of Ontario from 1959 to 1975 who represented the riding of Hamilton East and Hamilton Centre.

Background
He was born in Everett, Ontario in 1907. He worked as a machinist. In 1933 he married Murla Vernice Lunn in Hamilton, Ontario. Together they raised three children, two daughters and a son. He died at the age of 82 in Hamilton on June 28, 1990.

Politics
He was elected as the Co-operative Commonwealth Federation MPP for Hamilton East in the 1959 Ontario election. He was re-elected in the 1963 provincial election for the Ontario New Democratic Party which had been formed through the merger of the CCF and the labour movement. In 1967, he was elected to the riding of Hamilton Centre, representing it for two terms before leaving the legislature at the 1975 provincial election when he retired. He was succeeded by his son, Mike Davison, who held the riding in the 1975 and 1977 elections.

References

External links

1907 births
1990 deaths
Ontario Co-operative Commonwealth Federation MPPs
20th-century Canadian politicians
Ontario New Democratic Party MPPs